Stanley Tillekeratne (Sinhala: ස්ටැන්ලි තිලකරත්න) was a Sri Lankan politician. He was the Speaker of the Sri Lankan Parliament and later was the Governor of the Central Province of Sri Lanka from May 1998 to 2000.

Stanley Tillekeratne had a long liaison with the country's Left movement from 1947 before joining the Sri Lanka Freedom Party in 1965. He contested and won Kotte on the Communist Party ticket at the July 1960 elections and retained the seat in 1965 for the SLFP. He was reelected in 1970 and was made speaker of parliament, in which role he won the admiration even of his opponents for the impartial manner in which he conducted the affairs of the House. Along with many of the SLFP stalwarts he too suffered defeat at the 1977 poll, but he succeeded in remaining in the public eye as a champion human rights lawyer, especially during the turbulent period of 1989-90. He figured in several groundbreaking cases. At the 1989 elections he was returned to parliament from Colombo district and remained as an MP until his exit in 1994. He was governor of Central province in 1994-2000.

References

Speakers of the Parliament of Sri Lanka
Governors of Central Province, Sri Lanka
Sinhalese politicians
1920s births
2005 deaths